Rusia may refer to:

 Russia, a country in Eurasia known in several languages as Rusia
 Rusia, a name formerly applied to several mediaeval and early modern states, see Names of Rus', Russia and Ruthenia
 Rusia, Poland, a rural settlement in Poland
 Magda Rusia, Georgian gymnast

See also 
 Rusia Petroleum, a former Russian company
 Russia (disambiguation)
 Rusya, Belarusian singer
 Russya, Ukrainian singer
 Rosia (disambiguation)